is a train station Uji, Kyoto Prefecture, Japan, operated by West Japan Railway Company (JR West).

Lines
JR Ogura Station is served by the Nara Line.

Station Layout
The station has two side platforms serving one track each.

Platforms

Passenger statistics
According to the Kyoto Prefecture statistical report, the average number of passengers per day is as follows.

History
The station opened on 3 March 2001. It opened at the same time as the double track between Uji Station and Shinden Station on the Nara Line. The IC card ticket "ICOCA" can be used since 1 November 2003. 	
Station numbering was introduced in March 2018 with JR Fujinomori being assigned station number JR-D10.

Adjacent stations

References

External links

  

Railway stations in Kyoto Prefecture
Railway stations in Japan opened in 2001